University Heights station (also known as the University Heights–West 207th Street station) is a commuter rail stop on the Metro-North Railroad's Hudson Line, serving the University Heights neighborhood of the Bronx, New York City.

The station located between the Harlem River and the Major Deegan Expressway. Access to the platform is via a staircase from the pedestrian walkway on the south side of University Heights Bridge. It is also near the Roberto Clemente State Park.

History
The station has operated since the days of the Spuyten Duyvil and Port Morris Railroad as well as the New York and Putnam Railroad late in the 19th century, though not in its present form. It was originally located north of the former 180th Street (now Osbourne Place), while a nearby Fordham Heights station was located at West Fordham Road. At some point before the 1920s, the two stations were merged, although demolition of the Fordham Heights Station was being planned as early as 1906. North of Fordham Road, the former NY&P branched off to the northeast on its way to Brewster.

Throughout much of the 20th Century, University Heights station contained a station house over the tracks along the south side of West Fordham Road. As with many NYCRR stations in the Bronx, the station became a Penn Central station upon the merger between NYC and Pennsylvania Railroad in 1968. Penn Central continued commuter service and began tearing the station house down in 1975, before until it was taken over by Conrail in 1976, which turned the station over to Metro-North Railroad in 1983.

Station layout
The station has one 4-car-long high-level island platform accessible by stairway or elevator from West Fordham Road.

References

External links 

 Fordham Road entrance from Google Maps Street View
 Platform from Google Maps Street View

Metro-North Railroad stations in New York City
Former New York Central Railroad stations
Railway stations in the Bronx
University Heights, Bronx